Kaat Tilley (20 September 1959 – 22 June 2012) was a Belgian Flemish fashion designer known for her imaginative and devouring creations.

Career
Kaat Tilley grew up in Kapelle-op-den-Bos and as a child, she was fond of fairy tales. The inaccessibility, strength, beauty and fragility of the fairy-tale figure Snow White became her trademark. Tilley would regularly refer to this in her later visual work.

Tilley studied at Sint Lucas in Brussels and learned the technique of painting there. Tilley was a former student of the Antwerp Fashion Academy. She graduated there cum laude with the theme for her final collection Mahler and Venice .

Tilley was known for her romantic to fairytale clothing. In 1990 she designed a jewelry collection. In 1993 she signed the costumes for the film Antoine. Her creations are midway between fashion and art. She dressed among others Diana Ross, Barbra Streisand, Naomi Campbell, Melanie Griffith and Halle Berry.

In the meantime she became an established name, witness her retrospective exhibition at the Gaasbeek Castle in the autumn of 2005.

In 2007 Tilley kept on her living and working area in Asbeek (Asse) an exhibition and sale of a large part of her prototypes and paintings. She claimed that she was first a painter and secondly a fashion designer. Art and beauty were inextricably linked throughout her career.

She had a gallery in the Royal Gallery of the Brussels Galeries Royales Saint-Hubert. She designed costumes for Zap Mama and Madredeus. On a commercial level, she struggled with a few setbacks. After a bankruptcy in 2009 she returned two years later with a collection furniture, fabrics, lighting, jewelry and pictorial work. She designed the clothes for the opera La Traviata. The last ten years of her life she lived and worked in a converted watermill in Asbeek.

Illness and death
The designer overcame in 1989 a form of cancer. She died unexpectedly on 22 June 2012 of pneumonia by pneumococcus. She is survived by two daughters. The months before her death she had a lot of projects in the pipeline. For example, she designed the uniforms for the cabin crew of Thomas Cook Airlines Belgium and there was the collection for the clothing chain JBC. For the fall of 2012 she was working on the costume design of the musical Peter Pan. Preparations for the sale of its archive at the end of June 2012 were in full swing.

The funeral ceremony of the designer took place on 28 June in an intimate circle at her domain in Asbeek.

References

1959 births
2012 deaths
People from Mechelen
Belgian fashion designers
Belgian women fashion designers